The Baldwin DRS-4-4-1500 was a diesel-electric locomotive of the road switcher type rated at , that rode on two-axle trucks, having a B-B wheel arrangement.  It was manufactured by Baldwin Locomotive Works from 1947 until it was replaced in 1950 by the  AS-16.

Nine railroads bought 35 locomotives, with five railroads later buying the successor model.

References 
 

B-B locomotives
DRS-4-4-1500
Diesel-electric locomotives of the United States
Railway locomotives introduced in 1947
Standard gauge locomotives of the United States